Al Qusais is a rapid transit station on the Green Line of the Dubai Metro in Dubai, United Arab Emirates, serving the Al Qusais and Al Twar areas in Deira.

The station opened as part of the Green Line on 9 September 2011. It is close to the Al Salam Community School (ASCS) and the Al Qusais Police Station. The station is also close to a number of bus routes.

References

Railway stations in the United Arab Emirates opened in 2011
Dubai Metro stations